The William R. and Clarice V. Spurlock Museum, better known as the Spurlock Museum, is an ethnographic museum at the University of Illinois at Urbana-Champaign. The Spurlock Museum's permanent collection includes portions of collections from other museums and units on the Urbana-Champaign campus such as cultural artifacts from the Museum of Natural History and Department of Anthropology as well as historic clothing from the Bevier Collection of the College of Agricultural, Consumer and Environmental Sciences. The museum also holds objects donated by other institutions and private individuals. With approximately 51,000 objects in its artifact collection, the Spurlock Museum at the University of Illinois at Urbana-Champaign collects, preserves, documents, exhibits, and studies objects of cultural heritage. The museum's main galleries, highlighting the ancient Mediterranean, modern Africa, ancient Egypt, Mesopotamia, East Asia, Oceania, Europe, and the Americas, celebrate the diversity of cultures through time and across the globe.

History

The foundations of the modern Spurlock Museum can be traced back to 1911, when the university established the Museum of Classical Archaeology and Art and the Museum of European Culture.  These were joined in 1917 by the Oriental Museum, which merged with Classical Archaeology and Art in 1929.  In 1954 the Museum of European Culture joined with the merged Classical and Oriental Museum to form a single museum, which was renamed the World Heritage Museum in 1971.

From its beginnings in 1911, the museum in its various forms had operated out of a space on the fourth floor of Lincoln Hall.  In 1995 a donation by William and Clarice Spurlock made it possible for a new building to be constructed to house the museum and its growing collections.  In June 2000, the World Heritage Museum was renamed the William R. and Clarice V. Spurlock Museum, and on September 26, 2002, the museum opened to the public.

The size and age of the museum's collections made moving them from Lincoln Hall to the new Spurlock building a formidable task. The first complete inventory of the museum's holdings since 1972 was conducted before any of the objects were packed. More than 150 fields of information were recorded on each item. To pack the more than 30,000 items took thirty-five undergraduate students two years. Many of the boxes and crates for the most fragile artifacts were custom-made. The actual move between buildings took ten days.

Collection

The Spurlock Museum's artifact collection contains approximately 51,000 objects, covering six continents and one million years of human cultural history. A few of the significant collections include Parthenon frieze casts, Merovingian bronzes, Mesopotamian cuneiform tablets, and Amazonian bark cloth. Artifact preservation and public education are the main jobs of Spurlock Museum. Preservation is achieved by keeping the majority of artifacts in storage; following professional standards, the museum only displays four to five percent of its holdings at any one time. Stored artifacts can be made available for scholarly study or loans to other institutions, as well as serve as a core for temporary exhibitions. They may also be used through the information and images provided on the internet. Note: Not all of the artifacts mentioned below are displayed currently in the museum.

The Fred A. Freund Collection of Chinese and Japanese Wood Carvings
A collection of over 200 Japanese and Chinese wood carvings and associated materials have been received as a gift of Mr. Fred A. Freund.  Donated since 1999, the artifacts date from the Edo and Meiji periods in Japan and from the Qing dynasty in China.  The subject material depicted includes an assortment of human, animal, utilitarian and abstract images.

The Crocker Land Expedition-Collection from the Arctic
The Crocker Land Expedition Collection consists of over 200 artifacts and hundreds of photos collected between 1913 and 1917 by an Arctic exploration team led by ethnologist Donald B. MacMillan.  The photographs highlight the Inuit, landscapes, and wildlife while the ethnographic or cultural artifacts include hunting and whaling tools, clothing and sled equipment.

The Edgar J. Banks Collection of Sumerian and Babylonian Clay Tablets
This collection of approximately 1750 inscribed tablets from ancient sites of Umman and Drehem in Mesopotamia dates from the Third Dynasty of Ur in the 21st and 20th centuries BCE to the Neo-Babylonian and early Persian periods (ca. 625-520 BCE).  This collection includes texts written in both the Sumerian and the Akkadian languages. The script called cuneiform, is the earliest writing system in the world.

Feature galleries

The feature galleries make up the core structure of the Spurlock Museum.  The galleries feature exhibits on the ancient Mediterranean, Africa, East and Southeast Asia, Oceania, Europe, and the indigenous cultures of the Americas.

 Workman Gallery of Ancient Mediterranean Cultures
 Workman Gallery of Asian Cultures
 Faletti Gallery of African Cultures
 Laubin Gallery of American Indian Cultures
 Leavitt Gallery of Middle Eastern Cultures
 Simonds Pyatt Gallery of European Cultures

Areas
The Spurlock Museum building offers the following public areas and facilities:

 Five feature galleries covering Africa, East Asia, Southeast Asia, and Oceania, Europe, The Americas, and The Ancient Mediterranean.
 The Campbell Gallery, featuring exhibits that change twice a year.
 The 215-seat Knight Auditorium, site of lectures by local and visiting scholars as well as performances by musicians, dancers, actors, storytellers, and choral groups.
 The Dene W. and Marie C. Zahn Learning Center, a space for small-group activities, including teacher training workshops, craft activities, and hands-on artifact opportunities.
 The World Heritage Museum Guild Educational Resource Center, the source of a wide assortment of educational materials for instructors.

References

External links

Official website

University museums in Illinois
Natural history museums in Illinois
Museums in Champaign County, Illinois
Museums established in 2002
2002 establishments in Illinois
Museums of Ancient Near East in the United States
Museums of ancient Greece in the United States
Museums of ancient Rome in the United States
Egyptological collections in the United States
Asian art museums in the United States
Native American museums in Illinois
Plaster cast collections
Buildings and structures of the University of Illinois Urbana-Champaign
Buildings and structures in Urbana, Illinois